The Little Missouri Falls is a sizable waterfall on the upper reaches of the Little Missouri River in southwest Arkansas in the Ouachita National Forest. It is a stairstep fall in a deep gorge. The falls can be reached by an all-weather gravel road, and there is a parking area with restrooms and a paved trail leading to observation sites. Water flow is greatest during the winter and spring months.

References
United States Forest Service, Ouachita National Forest

Landmarks in Arkansas
Waterfalls of Arkansas
Little Missouri River (Arkansas)
Ouachita National Forest